So What?: Early Demos and Live Abuse is a 2CD compilation from English punk rock band, Anti-Nowhere League. It combines the now-deleted compilation of early demos, Out of Control and the live album The Horse is Dead on a single release.

Track listing
(all songs written by Animal/The Anti-Nowhere League unless noted.)

Disc 1 – The Horse is Dead
So What
Pig Iron
For You
Crime
Working for the Company
Animal
Nowhere Man
I Hate People
Let's Break the Law
Noddy
Snowman
Ballad of J.J. Decay
Wreck-a-Nowhere
Runaway (Del Shannon)
We're the League

Disc 2 – Out of Control
Loser
Landlord is a Wanker
I Get Bored
Head in the Wall
Street Life
Fat Bastards
Dirty Old Fucker
This is the 80s
Out of Control
Gimme Money
I Don't Wanna
Useless Bastards
Military Man
Sex & Fantasy
Top of the Pops

Anti-Nowhere League albums
2006 compilation albums
Demo albums
2006 live albums